N'Kosi Perry (born June 30, 1998) is an American football quarterback for the Florida Atlantic Owls.

Early years
Perry attended Vanguard High School in Ocala, Florida. He had 24 total touchdowns as a senior and 43 as a junior. He committed to the University of Miami to play college football.

College career
Perry redshirted his first year at Miami in 2017. He entered 2018 as the backup to Malik Rosier. After missing the first game of the season due to a violation of team rules, he received his first playing time the next week against Savannah State, throwing for 93 yards and three touchdowns. Two weeks later against FIU, Perry replaced Rosier after two series, and completed 17 of 25 passes for 224 yards and three touchdowns. The next week against North Carolina, he started his first career game.

Statistics

References

External links
Miami Hurricanes bio

1998 births
Living people
American football quarterbacks
Florida Atlantic Owls football players
Miami Hurricanes football players
Players of American football from Florida
Sportspeople from Ocala, Florida